Shri Radha Madan Mohan Temple, is a Hindu temple situated in Vrindavan of Indian state of Uttar Pradesh. It is one of the oldest and highly revered temple of Vrindavan. The presiding deity of the temple is Madan Mohan, a form of the god Krishna who is present in the central altar of the temple with his consort goddess Radha and Lalita gopi on either sides of him.

The temple is built in the Nagara style of architecture. On the bank of Yamuna River, Radha Madan Mohan Temple stands at a height of 50 feet near Kaliya Ghat. It is also one of the most popular Goswami shrines in Uttar Pradesh.

History 
According to popular folklore, Shri Radha Madan Mohan temple in Vrindavan is 5000 years old. It was first believed to be constructed by that the great-grandson of Krishna - Vajranabh. However, with the passage of time, deities were lost. Later, the deity of Madan Mohan was discovered at the base of an old banyan tree by Advaita Acharya, when he visited Vrindavan. He entrusted the worship of Madana Mohan to his disciple, Purusottama Chaube, who then gave the deity to Sanatana Goswami.

According to historical sources, it was in 1580 AD that this temple was rebuilt under the guidance of Sri Sanatana Goswami by a Multan trader Kapur Ram Das. As the temple was invaded by Mughal emperor Aurangzeb in 1670 AD, the original idol of Madan Mohan was secretly shifted to Jaipur by King Jai Singh overnight before the attack of Aurangzeb on Vrindavan and Mathura temples. Later, the deities are shifted to Karauli by King Gopal Singh. The original deities of Shri Radha Madan Mohan temple are presently installed in Madan Mohan temple of Karauli, Rajasthan.

The original deity of Madan Mohan is said to exactly resemble Krishna from the waist down. In 1748 AD, a replica of Madan Mohan was established in the Madan Mohan temple, Vrindavan. In 1819 AD, Nand Kumar Basu, rebuilt the temple at the foot of the hill near Yamuna river. Presently, Shri Radha Madan mohan temple of Vrindavan houses the replica of original deities which are installed in the Madan Mohan temple, Karauli.

Architecture 
Shri Radha Madan Mohan temple has Nagra style of architecture. It is built in oval shape with red sandstone. The temple is 20 meters high and is situated near river Yamuna.

Temple timings 

The time zone (UTC+05:30) observed through India by the priest.

Winter Timings : Morning 7:00 am to 12:00 pm, Evening 4:00 pm to 8:00 pm.

Summer Timings :  Morning 6:00 am to 11:00 am, Evening 5:00 pm to 9:30 pm.

Gallery

Nearby attractions 

 Kaliya Ghat
 Bankey Bihari Temple
 Radha Ramana Temple
 Nidhivan
 Seva Kunj
 Sanatana Goswami Samadhi
 Ashta Sakhi Temple.

See also 
 Madan Mohan
 Madan Mohan Temple, Karauli
 Radha Krishna
 Sanatana Goswami
Radha Damodar Temple, Vrindavan
Radha Vallabh Temple, Vrindavan 
Radha Krishna Vivah Sthali, Bhandirvan

References 

Krishna temples
Radha Krishna temples
Hindu temples in Mathura district
Vrindavan
Tourist attractions in Mathura district
16th-century Hindu temples